Dyffryn-bern is a small village in the  community of Penbryn, Ceredigion, Wales, which is 72.4 miles (116.5 km) from Cardiff and 191.8 miles (308.6 km) from London. Dyffryn-bern is represented in the Senedd by Elin Jones (Plaid Cymru) and is part of the Ceredigion constituency in the House of Commons. The names, originally, was from a farm of the same name, but is now used for the surrounding hamlet.

References

See also
List of localities in Wales by population

Villages in Ceredigion